Hajiganj Fort also known as Khizirpur fort, situated at Hajiganj locality of Narayanganj, Bangladesh, on the western bank of Shitalakshya.

History
The exact date of Hajiganj fort is uncertain but it may have been built soon after Subahdar Islam Khan established the Mughal capital at Dhaka.

Architecture
The fort, quadrangular in size, consists of a pentagonal curtain wall machicolated for muskets with rounded corner bastions. On the inner side of the curtain wall there is a 1.22 m high rampart walkway from the base of the curtain wall which is itself pierced by several musketry holes. The holes are wider meant probably for 'gun firing at the pirates proceeding up the river'. In a corner of the fort enclosure there is a tall free standing square column of brick which must have been used for observation and placing guns in the rainy season.

See also
 List of archaeological sites in Bangladesh

References
 Banglapedia: National Encyclopedia of Bangladesh
 Hajiganj Fort A Place Of Antiquity The Daily Observer, 29 January 2017. Retrieved 27 May 2017.

Forts in Bangladesh
Narayanganj